Duran Çetin (February 15, 1964) is a Turkish author of stories and novels. He was born in 1964 in the village of Apasaraycık in the Cumra district of Konya Province, Turkey.  He is married and has two children.

Bibliography
Duran Cetin was born in the village of Apasaraycık, which is in the Cumra district, in Konya, Turkey. He was educated at primary school in his village and then at a Vocational Religious High School (İmam Hatip Lisesi) in Cumra in 1981. He graduated from the Faculty of Theology in Selcuk University in 1986. His stories and articles have been published in Edebiyat Otağı, Berceste, Yeni Kardelen, Son Çağrı, Müsvedde, Yedi İklim, Dergah, Hece and local newspapers. Also they were published on internet sites such as edebistan.com, Kırkikindi, hikayeler.net, Hikayeler arşivi, Edebiyat Ufku, iz edebiyat, Sanat Alemi.

His first article "İki Eylül " was published in the local newspaper of Eskisehir in 1990. He prepared and presented radio programmes in many different fields. He is currently preparing and presenting a programme "Our Culture world" on KONTV.

Duran Cetin is a member of board in Turkey Author Association in Konya.

Works in Turkish

Novels
 Bir Adım Ötesi, Beka Yayınları, İstanbul,2002,
 Yolun Sonu, Beka Yayınları, İstanbul, 2004,
 Portakal Kızım, Beka Yayınları, İstanbul, 2005,
 Toprak Gönüllüler, Beka Yayınları, İstanbul, 2008,
 Portakal Kızım Sadece Ben, Beka Yayınları, İstanbul, 2010,
 Cüneyt, Beka Yayınları, İstanbul, 2012,
 Tebessüm Öğretmen ve Öğrencileri, Nar Yayınları, İstanbul, 2012,
 Muhteşem Yükseliş, Karatay Akademi Yayınları, Konya, 2013,
 Çılgın Okul, Beka Yayınları, İstanbul, 2013,

Stories
 Bir Kucak Sevgi, Beka Yayınları, İstanbul, 2000,
 Güller Solmasın, Beka Yayınları, İstanbul, 2000,
 Kırmızı Kardelenler, Beka Yayınları, İstanbul, 2003,
 Sana Bir Müjdem Var, Beka Yayınları, İstanbul, 2006,
 Gözlerdeki Mutluluk, Beka Yayınları, İstanbul, 2007,
 Minik Göl, Koski Yay, Konya, 2009,
 Büyük Ödül, Beka Yayınları, İstanbul, 2009,
 Balkondaki Adam, Beka Yayınları, İstanbul, 2009,
 Kül Yığını, Beka Yayınları, İstanbul, 2010,
 Bir Yudum Şehir, Meram Belediyesi Kültür Yayınları, Konya, 2011
 Bekleyiş, Meram Belediyesi Kültür Yayınları, Konya, 2011

Fabls
 Gökkuşağı Yolculuğu, Gonca Yayınları, İstanbul, 2010,
 Macera Peşinde, Nar Yayınları, İstanbul, 2012,

References
 beyazgazete  
 kim kimdir?

External links
 durancetin.com – A website dedicated to Duran Çetin

1964 births
Selçuk University alumni
Turkish writers
Living people
Imam Hatip school alumni